In Greek mythology, Perseus (/ˈpɜːrsiəs, -sjuːs/; Ancient Greek: Περσεύς) was a prince of Pylos in Messenia.

Biography 
Perseus was the son of King Nestor either by Eurydice or Anaxibia. He was the brother to Thrasymedes, Pisidice, Polycaste, Peisistratus, Stratichus, Aretus, Echephron and Antilochus.

Notes

References 

 Homer, The Odyssey with an English Translation by A.T. Murray, PH.D. in two volumes. Cambridge, MA., Harvard University Press; London, William Heinemann, Ltd. 1919. Online version at the Perseus Digital Library. Greek text available from the same website.
 Pseudo-Apollodorus, The Library with an English Translation by Sir James George Frazer, F.B.A., F.R.S. in 2 Volumes, Cambridge, MA, Harvard University Press; London, William Heinemann Ltd. 1921. Online version at the Perseus Digital Library. Greek text available from the same website.

Princes in Greek mythology

Pylian characters in Greek mythology
Children of Nestor (mythology)